a.k.a. Contraceptive Revolution is a 1967 Japanese pink film directed by Masao Adachi for Kōji Wakamatsu's production studio.

Synopsis
The insane gynaecologist, Dr. Marukido Sadao (Marquis de Sade), theorizes that a woman is unable to become pregnant if she is writhing in intense pain during intercourse. He sets about testing this new method of birth control by torturing women during sex.

Cast
 Mikio Terajima as Dr. Marquis de Sade (Marukido Sadao - )
 Kozue Kashima as Mitsuko Marukido
 Atsushi Yamatoya as Nishimura
 Kuniko Masuda
 Hachirō Tobita
 Hatsuo Yamaya as Saburō Kyōtani
 Kōji Wakamatsu as Weekly magazine photographer
 Shigeomi Satō as Blue film actor

Background and critical appraisal
Masao Adachi filmed Birth Control Revolution for Kōji Wakamatsu's Wakamatsu Productions and it was released theatrically in Japan by Nihon Cinema on February 21, 1967. Adachi used the character of the crazy gynaecologist, Marukido Sadao—a Japanese pun on "Marquis de Sade"—in his first pink film, Abortion (1966). He used the name in one or two of his film scripts directed by Kōji Wakamatsu. According to writer on Japanese cinema, Roland Domenig, these "mad gynaecologist" films, as well as Wakamatsu's "embryo" or "return to the womb" films such as The Embryo Hunts in Secret (1966), represent a re-imagining and parody of the "birth control" films which lured in audiences with titillating marketing strategies during the 1950s.

Allmovie notes that despite the main character's "silly name", the film is actually a quite grim "twisted softcore S & M film". The review warns off viewers who are not comfortable with sadism as entertainment, in the style of many pink films. In their Japanese Cinema Encyclopedia: The Sex Films, the Weissers also note that it is a dark film, and "one of those excursions into sado-erotic fare that makes Western audiences cringe".

Bibliography

English

Japanese

Notes

1967 films
1960s Japanese-language films
Pink films
1960s Japanese films